Vachharadada or Vachhrajdada (Gujarati: ISO 15919: Vācharādādā, Vacharājdādā; Gujarati: વાછરાદાદા, વછરાજદાદા; IPA: vaːtʃʰəraːda:da:, vətʃʰəraːdʒda:da:) is a Hindu deity from Gujarat in India. He is an eminent warrior-hero of the region. Hindus honor him as a deity.

Legends
Vachhraj Dada is known as a Solanki Rajput who died protecting the cows of the Charans, who were being raided by dacoits. He came to be worshipped by various communities like Charans, Ahirs, and Rajputs. He is represented on a stone slab as sitting on a horse. Historically, Charans performed priestly functions at the shrine of Vachhraj Dada. The devotees considered taking vows in name of Vachhraj Dada would cure poisonous bites from snakes.

According to folk tales, Vatsarajsinh Solanki or Vachhara was a son of Thakhatsinh Solanki and Akalba. He belonged to Rajput caste of a Solanki ruler named Chachak in Kathiawar, who ruled from Kalri, presently located in Mehsana district. One day he was getting married, when he was taking the feras, he heard the news that some dacoits were looting and taking the cows of village. He left the marriage ceremony in the middle to fight the plunderers, in which he attained martyrdom. According to the legend, it is believed that Vachhara's head was severed in the fight by sword of an enemy, but even after that his body fought against the people and killed them all. In veneration of his heroic sacrifice, a temple was later built in his memory.

It is said that Vachara's wife Umade wanted to become a sati but was stopped by saint, who asked her to go to her in-laws house. Vachara was blessed by the God and was asked to consummate the marriage in vayu form. Thus, twenty two sons were born to him, Solanki descendants of whom all worship him as their kuldevta. Mers also worship Vachra Dada and is one of main deity of their caste.

Folklore also says that he was reborn seven times, and every time he would do Pheras, he would be interrupted by acts of dacoits taking away the cows. In his seventh life he successfully killed the dacoits. Thus he became a Shurveer in seven cycle of birth as per Hindu myths and became a demi-god after that.

Iconography
Vachhada Dada is shown sitting on a white Kathiawari horse with a snake at his feet and a flaming sword in his hands. He is worshiped by Khedut' (Gujarati word for a farmer) to protect their cattle and keep their crops thriving and also from protection of snake bites. Many temples and shrines can be found throughout Gujarat devoted to him.

Temples
The location where he became martyr is also named Vachhara Dada. It is located at edge of Little Rann of Kutch, 35 km from Kuda (near Dhangadhra); 15 km from Vatsrajpur, and 8 km from Zinzuwadia. The place today is a pilgrimage centre and houses the main temple and samadhi of Vachra Dada. 407 km from Zinjuvada, the temple of vachradada is situated at bitta. Ta. Abdasa-kutch which is known as Jangirdada. The drive to this place along the little Runn itself is very adventurous and a unique experience.

Other major temples are located in Dundas, Mahuva, Narigam, Nari, Devada, Porbandar, Patan, Godhana, Bhanvad, Khambhalia, Dwarka, Mandvi, Anjar, Rangpur and Mahisa, Rajkot to name a few.

Culture
There are many folk songs, Bhajans in praise of Vachhara Dada, which are very popular in Kutch and Saurashtra regions of Gujarat, amongst which most noted are Dham dham dhame Nagara, Rajputo ma ek ladvayo, Rane chadyo veer, Jai Veer Vachhara Dada'' all in Gujarati language, sung by folk singers like Kirtidan Gadhvi and others.

See also
Bhathiji

References

External links
 
 Vatsaraj Solanki/Vachhada Dada
Hindu folk deities
Heroes in mythology and legend